The men's 200 metre individual medley event at the 2000 Summer Olympics took place on 20–21 September at the Sydney International Aquatic Centre in Sydney, Australia.

Massimiliano Rosolino blasted a new Olympic record to add Italy's third gold medal in swimming at these Games. He edged out U.S. swimmer Tom Dolan with a fastest split (33.52) on the breaststroke leg to take over the lead at the final turn, and hit the wall first in a sterling time of 1:58.98, clipping 0.93 seconds off a record set by Hungary's Attila Czene in Atlanta. Dolan, the defending champion in the 400 m individual medley four days earlier, became the first American to break a two-minute barrier, taking home the silver in a new national record of 1:59.77. Meanwhile, Tom Wilkens earned a bronze in 2:00.87, handing an entire medal haul for the U.S. team with a two–three finish.

Czene, the defending Olympic champion, finished outside the podium in fourth place with a time of 2:01.16. Netherlands' Marcel Wouda came up with a spectacular swim on the breaststroke leg, but fell short to fifth spot in 2:01.48. Wouda was followed in sixth by Germany's Christian Keller (2:02.02), and in seventh by France's Xavier Marchand (2:02.23). Finland's world record holder Jani Sievinen closed out the field with an eighth-place finish in 2:02.49.

Records
Prior to this competition, the existing world and Olympic records were as follows.

The following new world and Olympic records were set during this competition.

Results

Heats

Semifinals

Semifinal 1

Semifinal 2

Final

References

External links
Official Olympic Report

M
Men's events at the 2000 Summer Olympics